"Another Brick in the Wall" is a three-part composition on Pink Floyd's 1979 rock opera The Wall, written by bassist Roger Waters. "Part 2", a protest song against corporal punishment, and rigid and abusive schooling, features a children's choir. At the suggestion of producer Bob Ezrin, Pink Floyd added elements of disco.

"Part 2" was released as a single, Pink Floyd's first in the UK since "Point Me at the Sky" (1968). It sold over four million copies worldwide and topped singles charts in fourteen countries, including in the UK and United States. It was nominated for a Grammy Award and was ranked number 384 on Rolling Stones list of "The 500 Greatest Songs of All Time".

Concept 
The three parts of "Another Brick in the Wall" appear on Pink Floyd's 1979 rock opera album The Wall. They are essentially one verse each, although Part 2 sees its own verse sung twice: once by Floyd members, and the second time by the guest choir along with Waters and Gilmour. During "Part 1", the protagonist, Pink, begins building a metaphorical wall around himself following the death of his father. In "Part 2", traumas involving his overprotective mother and abusive schoolteachers become bricks in the wall. Following a violent breakdown in "Part 3", Pink dismisses everyone he knows as "just bricks in the wall."

Bassist Roger Waters wrote "Part 2" as a protest against rigid schooling, particularly boarding schools. "Another Brick in the Wall" appears in the film based on the album. In the "Part 2" sequence, children enter a school and march in unison through a meat grinder, becoming "putty-faced" clones, before rioting and burning down the school.

Recording 

At the suggestion of producer Bob Ezrin, Pink Floyd added elements of disco, which was popular at the time. According to guitarist David Gilmour:

Gilmour recorded his guitar solo using a 1955 Gibson Les Paul Gold Top guitar with P-90 pick-ups. Despite his reservations about Ezrin's additions, Gilmour felt the final song still sounded like Pink Floyd. When Ezrin heard the song with a disco beat, he was convinced it could become a hit, but felt it needed to be longer, with two verses and two choruses. The band resisted, saying they did not release singles; Waters told him: "Go ahead and waste your time doing silly stuff."

While the band members were away, Ezrin edited the takes into an extended version. He also had engineer Nick Griffiths record children singing the verse at Islington Green School, close to Pink Floyd's studio. Griffiths was instructed to record only two or three children; inspired by a Todd Rundgren album featuring an audience in each stereo channel, he suggested recording an entire school choir. The school allotted only 40 minutes for the recording.

Alun Renshaw, head of music at the school, was enthusiastic, and said later: "I wanted to make music relevant to the kids – not just sitting around listening to Tchaikovsky. I thought the lyrics were great – 'We don't need no education, we don't need no thought control' ... I just thought it would be a wonderful experience for the kids." Renshaw hid the lyrics from the headteacher, Margaret Maden, fearing she might stop the recording. Maden said: "I was only told about it after the event, which didn't please me. But on balance it was part of a very rich musical education." Renshaw and the children spent a week practising before he took them to a recording studio near the school. According to Ezrin, when he played the children's vocals to Waters, "there was a total softening of his face, and you just knew that he knew it was going to be an important record." Waters said: "It was great—exactly the thing I expected from a collaborator."

For the single version, a four-bar instrumental intro was added to the song that was created by looping a section of the backing track. The single fades out during the guitar solo. The version included on the compilation A Collection of Great Dance Songs combines the single version's intro and the LP version's ending. (Later compilations such as Echoes: The Best of Pink Floyd and The Best of Pink Floyd: A Foot in the Door instead include the album version prefaced by "The Happiest Days of Our Lives".)

In exchange for performing vocals, the children of Islington School received tickets to a Pink Floyd concert, an album, and a single. Though the school received a payment of £1,000, there was no contractual arrangement for royalties for the children. Following a change to UK copyright law in 1996, they became eligible for royalties from broadcasts. After royalties agent Peter Rowan traced the choir members through the website Friends Reunited and other means, they successfully lodged a claim for royalties with the Performing Artists' Media Rights Association in 2004.

Reception 
"Another Brick in the Wall (Part 2)" was released as a single, Pink Floyd's first in the UK since "Point Me at the Sky" (1968). It was also the Christmas number one of 1979 and the final number one of the decade in the UK. In the US, it reached number 57 on the disco chart. The single sold over 4 million copies worldwide.  Cash Box described it as a "catchy but foreboding selection, with its ominously steady drum work and angry lyrics."

The song won Waters the 1983 British Academy Award for Best Original Song for its appearance in the Wall film. "Part 2" was nominated for a Grammy Award for Best Performance by a Rock Duo or Group. It appeared at number 384 on Rolling Stones 2010 list of "The 500 Greatest Songs of All Time".

The lyrics attracted controversy. The Inner London Education Authority described the song as "scandalous", and according to Renshaw, prime minister Margaret Thatcher "hated it". Renshaw said, "There was a political knee-jerk reaction to a song that had nothing to do with the education system. It was [Waters's] reflections on his life and how his schooling was part of that." The single, as well as the album The Wall, were banned in South Africa in 1980 after it was adopted by supporters of a nationwide school boycott protesting instituted racial inequities in education under apartheid.

Charts

Weekly charts

Year-end charts

All-time charts

Sales and certifications

Personnel 
Personnel, according to The Pink Floyd Encyclopedia.
Part 1
 Roger Waters – lead vocals, bass
 David Gilmour – guitar, harmony vocals
 Richard Wright – Prophet-5 synthesizer, Minimoog
Part 2
 Roger Waters – bass, vocals (unison with Gilmour)
 David Gilmour – guitar, vocals (unison with Waters)
 Nick Mason – drums
 Richard Wright – Hammond organ, Prophet-5 synthesizer
 Islington Green School students (organized by Alun Renshaw) – vocals
Part 3
 Roger Waters – bass, vocals, rhythm guitar
 David Gilmour – guitar
 Nick Mason – drums
 Richard Wright – Prophet-5 synthesizer

Pink Floyd live versions 
The song featured in most Pink Floyd live gigs since its release (the only notable exceptions being the Knebworth 1990 appearance and the Live 8 reunion gig).

During the 1980/1981 Wall tour, the song was performed close to the original recording (with the children's singing played from tape), except that the ending was markedly expanded. As can be heard on Is There Anybody Out There? The Wall Live 1980–81, Gilmour's solo was followed by another guitar solo (played by Snowy White in 1980 and Andy Roberts in 1981) and finally an organ solo by Richard Wright.

The song was differently arranged on both tours after the departure of Roger Waters. On all shows of the Gilmour-led Floyd, Gilmour sang the lead vocals in unison with Guy Pratt, the children's vocals were augmented by live singing from the female backing vocalists, and the song incorporated a second guitar solo (by Tim Renwick) but no keyboard solo. Aside from this, the overall arrangements in 1987–1989 and 1994 were different. On the A Momentary Lapse of Reason tour, the two guitar solos were adjoined by a short piece of jamming. The song now started with an intro similar to the single version but with a 'teaser break' before the start of the vocals, and ended with a fadeout drowned out by children's voices (not dissimilar to the album version). This arrangement can be heard on Delicate Sound of Thunder.

The 1994 tour, instead, saw a different and longer version that combines elements of all the songs's three parts. On Pulse, the song opens with the phone signal (which originally bridged Part 2 with "Mother"), then a helicopter is heard (from "The Happiest Days of Our Lives"), before the band starts playing a short instrumental excerpt of Part 1. The bombastic ending of "The Happiest Days of Our Lives" leads into Part 2 (as on the album), and the ending incorporates the keyboard arpeggio of Part 3, the return of helicopter noises before the song comes to a full stop (as opposed to a fade-out). On the version from the video, the final minute also includes a sample of the vocal echo of "Dogs".

From 1988 onwards, Pink Floyd utilized additional sampled parts of the kids' choir, which were triggered by Jon Carin. Most notably, the space between the second verse and David Gilmour's solo was always filled with the shout "Hey, teacher!". In addition, on 1988 and 1989 shows, Carin also triggered the same sample in a 'stuttering' manner over Guy Pratt's short bass solo bridging Gilmour's and Renwick's solo. On the original releases of Delicate Sound of Thunder and Pulse however, this effect was muted (even though the DVD of Pulse still shows the stage LEDs spelling out "HEY TEACHER" at the appropriate moments). The 2019 remix of Delicate Sound of Thunder restores the first "Hey, teacher" and even brings the second sampling up in the mix, despite it being relatively quiet on all bootlegs of the era and inaudible on the mix of the Venice concert, which however has the first "Hey, teacher" intact.

Roger Waters versions 

A live version of "Another Brick in the Wall, Part 2" with Cyndi Lauper on vocals, recorded on 21 July 1990 at Potsdamer Platz, was released as a single on 10 September 1990 to promote The Wall – Live in Berlin. The B-side was the live version of "Run Like Hell" performed with Scorpions at the same concert.

In promotion of The Wall – Live in Berlin a new studio version was recorded by Roger Waters & The Bleeding Heart Band that was released on promo compilation titled The Wall Berlin '90 featuring Pink Floyd and Roger Waters solo recordings.

Another live version appeared on Waters' album In the Flesh – Live, integrated between "The Happiest Days of Our Lives" and "Mother" as on the original album, but with a reprise of the first verse ending the song.

For later shows, Waters usually employed local school choirs to perform the song with him (as can be seen on Roger Waters: The Wall). From 2011 to 2013, Waters added an acoustic coda called "The Ballad of Jean Charles de Menezes".

Track listings

Korn version 

Nu metal band Korn covered all three parts along with "Goodbye Cruel World" in 2004 for the compilation album Greatest Hits, Vol. 1. The cover was released as a promotional single, peaking at number 37 on the Modern Rock chart and number 12 on the Mainstream Rock chart. A live music video was released to promote the single, directed by Bill Yukich.

Will Levith of Ultimate Classic Rock called Korn's cover "one of the worst covers of a classic rock song of all time". Jason Birchmeier of AllMusic described it as "overwrought, yet enticingly so".

Track listing

Charts

Personnel 
 Jonathan Davis – vocals
 James "Munky" Shaffer – lead guitar
 Brian "Head" Welch – rhythm guitar
 Reginald "Fieldy" Arvizu – bass
 David Silveria – drums

Derivative works 

 The rock band Blurred Vision released a cover of Pink Floyd's "Another Brick In The Wall Part 2" dubbed "Hey Ayatollah Leave Those Kids Alone". Filmmaker Babak Payami produced a music video, which quickly went viral on the video-sharing platform YouTube. The remake was also publicly endorsed by Pink Floyd's Roger Waters. In October 2022 in reaction to the Great wave of Iranian protests of Autumn 2022 the band published an updated clip, featuring scenes from these protests with women taking off their obligatory headscarfs.

See also 
 "Proper Education" – a 2007 remix of the song by Swedish DJ Eric Prydz, with the band credited as Floyd.
 List of anti-war songs (pertaining to part one)

References

Citations

Sources

Further reading 
 Fitch, Vernon and Mahon, Richard, Comfortably Numb – A History of The Wall 1978–1981, 2006

External links 

1979 singles
1979 songs
1980 singles
1980 songs
Billboard Hot 100 number-one singles
Cashbox number-one singles
Columbia Records singles
Epic Records singles
Eric Burdon songs
Harvest Records singles
Irish Singles Chart number-one singles
Mercury Records singles
Number-one singles in Australia
Number-one singles in Belgium
Number-one singles in Denmark
Number-one singles in Germany
Number-one singles in New Zealand
Number-one singles in South Africa
Number-one singles in Spain
Number-one singles in Switzerland
Pink Floyd songs
Protest songs
RPM Top Singles number-one singles
Song recordings produced by Bob Ezrin
Song recordings produced by David Gilmour
Song recordings produced by Roger Waters
Songs about childhood
Songs about educators
Songs about school
Songs about World War II
Songs written by Roger Waters
UK Singles Chart number-one singles